Sir Tristram (IRE) (7 April 1971 – 21 May 1997) was an Irish-bred Thoroughbred racehorse who stood at stud in New Zealand, where he sired an extraordinary 45 Group One winners, including three Melbourne Cup winners.  His progeny earned him 17 official Leading Australasian sire premierships, plus nine broodmare sire titles.

Background
Sir Tristram was by the outstanding racehorse and sire Sir Ivor (by Sir Gaylord) out of Isolt (by Round Table), and had 19 starts for two wins in France.

Racing career
Trained by Charles Milbank and raced in Ireland, England and France, owner Raymond Guest sent Sir Tristram to Churchill Downs in Louisville, Kentucky to compete in the 1974 Kentucky Derby. Under jockey Bill Hartack, the colt finished eleventh.

Stud record
Following his racing career, he was purchased by Sir Patrick Hogan of Cambridge Stud in New Zealand, and entered stud in 1976 at the modest stud fee of $1,200.  By the time of his death in August 1997, his fee had risen to $200,000.  'Paddy', as he was affectionately known, had a reputation as a difficult horse to handle, although this is not a trait which seems to have been inherited by his progeny.  In fact, he was so difficult that his handler was forced to wear protective gear, which remains on display at Cambridge Stud.  Sir Tristram is the sire of over 140 stakes winners, including the Melbourne Cup winners Gurner's Lane (1982), Empire Rose (1988), and Brew (2000).  He is also the broodmare sire of over 200 stakes winners, including the Melbourne Cup winners Saintly and Ethereal, and has earned himself a reputation as a sire of sires.  His sire sons include Zabeel (who stood at Cambridge Stud at a fee of NZD$100,000), Marauding, Dr Grace and Grosvenor.

Whilst he was known as a sire of stayers, Sir Tristram's progeny and further descendants have excelled over a wide range of distances.  As well as siring winners of the Melbourne Cup (the world's richest handicap – over 3,200 metres), Sir Tristram sired Marauding, who won a Golden Slipper (the world's richest two-year-old race – over 1,200 metres), and several other outstanding two-year-olds. During 1984 to 1987 and 1988 to 1990 he was the Leading sire in Australia, Leading Broodmare Sire in Australia and in 1986/7 the Leading Sire of New Zealand.

Sir Tristram was humanely euthanized in 1997 after he broke his shoulder and he was buried standing up – 'A priest conducted a 40-minute service for the horse they called "Paddy"'.

In 2008, Sir Tristram was inducted in the New Zealand Racing Hall of Fame.

Progeny
Sir Tristram's 45 Group 1 winners:

Pedigree

References

External links
Cambridge Stud

1971 racehorse births
1997 racehorse deaths
Champion Thoroughbred Sires of Australia
Champion Thoroughbred Sires of New Zealand
Racehorses bred in Ireland
Racehorses trained in the United Kingdom
New Zealand Racing Hall of Fame horses
New Zealand Thoroughbred sires
Thoroughbred family 6-e